Archangel Michael fights the devil and the Virgin of the Assumption of the Angels is an oil painting on canvas (243x166 cm) of Dosso Dossi and Battista Dossi, dated to about 1533 to 1534 and  preserved at the Galleria nazionale di Parma.

References

Sources

External links
 Web site of Galleria nazionale di Parma

1530s paintings
Paintings by Dosso Dossi
Collections of the Galleria nazionale di Parma